Stoessel, Stössel, or Stossel may refer to:

Albert Stoessel (1894–1943), American composer, violinist and conductor
Anatoly Stessel (1848–1915), Russian baron, military leader, and general
Johann Stössel (1524–1576), Lutheran reformer and theologian
John Stossel (born 1947), American journalist and TV presenter with Fox
Ludwig Stössel (1883–1973), Jewish actor forced to flee Europe in 1933
Martina Stoessel (born 1997), Argentine singer and actress
Scott Stossel, American journalist and editor
Thomas P. Stossel, (born c. 1941), M.D. and author at Harvard Medical School
Walter John Stoessel, Jr. (1920–1986), U.S. diplomat

See also
Stoessel lute, musical instrument
Stossel (TV series), political talk show on Fox Business Network